Andersen Racing was a professional auto racing team that competed in Firestone Indy Lights and Star Mazda competition. It was owned by Dan Andersen, who founded the U.S. F2000 National Championship in 1991 and his brother John Andersen. The team was formed in 1999 and competed in amateur SCCA Formula Continental and the similar F2000 Championship pro series.

In 2006 the team began racing in Star Mazda and they began racing in Indy Lights in 2007 fielding a car for Andrew Prendeville and Joey Scarallo who was replaced by J. R. Hildebrand for the last three races of the season. The Indy Lights team was in partnership with Rahal Letterman Racing. Hildebrand joined the team full-time in 2008 and the second car was shared by Prendeville who left the team mid-season and Daniel Herrington who stepped in to replace him. Hildebrand captured the team's first Indy Lights win at Kansas Speedway and finished 5th in points. The team also won the 2008 Star Mazda Team Championship.

Mario Romancini drove the team's primary car full-time in 2009 and won two races on his way to 6th in the championship. The team also fielded up to two additional cars for four more drivers on a part-time basis. They fielded three cars (for Conor Daly, Joel Miller, and Richard Kent) in Star Mazda that won three races and finished 3rd, 5th, and 7th in the drivers championship respectively.

The team was unable to field a car full-time in 2010 as the team's initial full-time driver Spaniard Carmen Jordá suffered from a lack of funding and other drivers had to be drafted into the car on a race-by-race basis. Seven different drivers took the wheel of Andersen's Indy Lights cars in 2010. Andersen driver Anders Krohn placed second in the 2010 Star Mazda Championship season and the team's four drivers combined to win a second team championship for Andersen. The team shut down operations in Indy Lights and Star Mazda prior to the 2011 season for financial reasons as well as for Andersen to focus on his revived U.S. F2000 National Championship series that he promotes, and in 2013 took over the Pro Mazda Championship.

The team owns and operates the Andersen Racepark karting facility at their headquarters in Palmetto, Florida.

Motorsports results
(key)  (Races in bold indicate pole position) (Races in italics indicate fastest lap)

Complete USF2000 results

Complete Formula SCCA results

Complete Star Mazda results

Complete Indy Lights results

References

External links
Andersen Racing official website
Rebuilding America's open-wheel ladder system - Gordon Kirby, 5 August 2013

American auto racing teams
Indy Lights teams